Melodia is the fourth studio album by Australian alternative rock band The Vines. The album was produced by Rob Schnapf, and subsequently released by Ivy League Records in Australia on 12 July 2008, and through retailer Insound, in the United States on 22 July 2008. The album peaked at number 12 on the Australian ARIA Charts.

Background
Recording of the album was completed during the week of 3–10 March 2008, with a release occurring in July 2008. Originally thought to be called Braindead, the title of the album was confirmed via their MySpace website on 22 May 2008 to be Melodia and an official track listing was also announced. The band demoed 25 songs, only 14 of which made the final cut. This is The Vines' first album for record label Ivy League Records, after parting ways with EMI and Capitol Records in 2007. The band began recording in Los Angeles in November 2007 with producer Rob Schnapf, who has also worked on their albums Highly Evolved and Winning Days. The song "True as the Night" is the sequel to the song "Vision Valley", which appeared on the album of the same name.

The first single "He's a Rocker" was debuted officially at the 2008 MTV Awards in Australia, on 26 April, with airplay beginning on radio soon after. "He's a Rocker" was released through iTunes on 3 June, with two bonus tracks. "Blue Jam" being a rough early version of "Jamola" with "Hey Now" being an exclusive non-album song.

A limited number of signed copies of the album were made available for online pre-order on 23 June in Australia, whilst Melodia was sold on CD exclusively in the United States by Insound, from 22 July. Orders online through Insound received a free MP3 of the song "Make Believe".

Melodia had its UK physical release on 6 October 2008. The second single from the album is "Get Out".

"Get Out" is part of the soundtrack played during the video game Midnight Club: Los Angeles.

It was announced in February of 2021 that Melodia would be reissued for Record Store Day on 21 June 2021.

In comparison to their previous albums, it has received mixed reviews from critics, a situation that has recurred with every album released since Winning Days.

Reception

Initial critical response to Melodia was average. At Metacritic, which assigns a normalised rating out of 100 to reviews from mainstream critics, the album has received an average score of 44, based on 10 reviews.

Track listing

B-sides and bonus tracks

Personnel
Craig Nicholls – vocals, guitars, album cover with Love Police
Ryan Griffiths – guitars, backing vocals
Hamish Rosser – drums, percussion
Brad Heald – bass, backing vocals
Rob Schnapf – production, mixing, 12-string guitar on "Orange Amber" and acoustic guitar on "A.S. III"
Doug Boehm – recording, mixing
Graham Hope – assistant recording
Dave Bowling – assistant recording
Jason Gossman – assistant mixing
Clint Welander – assistant mixing
John Oreshnick – drum tuning / drum set
Jason Borger – string arrangement ("True as the Night")
Daphne Chen – violin
Amy Wickman – violin
Stirling Trent – violin
Matt Fish – cello
Love Police – album sleeve / artwork

Charts

Release history

References

External links

2008 albums
Ivy League Records albums
The Vines (band) albums
Albums produced by Rob Schnapf